The 29 (Explosive Ordnance Disposal and Search) Group, formerly 29 Engineer Brigade, is an engineer formation of the British Army responsible for Explosive Ordnance Disposal and Search. Its headquarters were at Aldershot.

History
The brigade had its origins as 29 Engineer Group formed in Glasgow in 1961. It was expanded and became 29th Engineer Brigade in 1967. By 1982, the brigade headquarters moved from Edinburgh to Imphal Barracks York with signals support at Fenham Barracks in Newcastle-upon-Tyne. Isby and Kamps wrote that around 1984-85 the brigade consisted of 72 Eningeer Regiment, 73 Engineer Regiment, 74 Engineer Regiment and 105 (V) Plant Squadron, with 72 and 73 Regiments supporting 2nd Infantry Division and 74 Regiment supporting 1st Infantry Brigade.

In around 1989, the brigade's units included 71, 72, 73 Engineer Regiments, 105 Plant Squadron, 117 Field Support Squadron, and 873 Movement Lights Squadron. After the Options for Change reforms, the brigade disbanded.

In 1997, the brigade was reformed as 29 (Corps Support) Engineer Brigade from the Central Volunteer Headquarters, Royal Engineers. It was given responsibility for administering a series of Specialist Teams Royal Engineers ('STRE's). Its headquarters was established at Aldershot. It had been renamed 29 (Land Support) Engineer Group by 2008 and, because its main capability was Explosive Ordnance Disposal (EOD), it had been renamed 29 (Explosive Ordnance Disposal and Search) Group by 2011.

Structure in 1997 
The following was the structure when it was reformed as a corps support engineer brigade in 1997:

 Royal Monmouthshire Militia Regiment, Royal Engineers
101 Militia Headquarters Squadron
100 Militia Field Squadron
108 (Welsh) Militia Field Support Squadron
225 (City of Birmingham) Militia Construction Squadron
143 Plant Squadron
 75 (Lancashire and Cheshire) Engineer Regiment, (Volunteers), Royal Engineers
201 Headquarters Squadron
107 (Lancashire and Cheshire) Field Squadron
202 Field Squadron
125 (Staffordshire) Field Support Squadron
 101 (City of London) Engineer Regiment, Royal Engineers
233 EOD Headquarters Squadron
222 Field EOD Squadron
221 Field EOD Squadron
220 EOD Field Squadron
 135 Topographical Squadron, Royal Engineers
 Military Works Force, Royal Engineers

After reformed as an engineer brigade for the ACE Rapid Reaction Corps, plans were made for the brigade to take under command other units from other ARRC  engineer regiments. Therefore, under an operational deployment 101st (Netherlands) Engineer Battalion, 5th (Polish) Engineer Regiment (two battalions), 6th (Italian) Engineer Regiment, and A (Turkish) Engineer Company would all fall under its operational control.

Current Organisation 
The brigade exists as 29 (Explosive Ordnance Disposal and Search) Group under 8th Engineer Brigade. The structure is as follows:

 Headquarters at Didcot
 11 (Explosive Ordnance Disposal & Search) Regiment, Royal Logistic Corps
 Regimental Headquarters at Didcot
 421 Explosive Ordnance Disposal & Search Squadron at Didcot
 321 Explosive Ordnance Disposal & Search Squadron at Joint Helicopter Command Flying Station Aldergrove
 521 Explosive Ordnance Disposal Squadron at Catterick, Chester and Edinburgh
 621 Explosive Ordnance Disposal Squadron at RAF Northolt, Shorncliffe, Aldershot and Colchester
 721 Explosive Ordnance Disposal Squadron at Ashchurch, Tidworth and Nottingham
29 EOD&S Group Support Unit, Royal Engineers
Regimental Headquarters at Wimbish
Operational Support Group
Training Support Group
29 Group REME Workshop
 33 (Explosive Ordnance Disposal) Regiment, Royal Engineers
 Regimental Headquarters at Wimbish
 49 Explosive Ordnance Disposal & Search Squadron (New Squadron)
 58 Field Squadron
 821 Field Squadron
 35 Engineer Regiment, Royal Engineers
 Regimental Headquarters at Wimbish
 15 EOD Field Squadron
 17 Field EOD Squadron
 21 EOD Field Squadron
 101 (City of London) Explosive Ordnance Disposal and Search Engineer Regiment, Royal Engineers (V)
 Regimental Headquarters at Catford
 217 (London) Explosive Ordnance Disposal Field Squadron at Ilford, Southend, and White City
 221 Explosive Ordnance Disposal Field Squadron at Catford and Rochester
 350 (Sherwood Foresters) Air Support Explosive Ordnance Disposal Field Squadron at Chilwell and Chesterfield
 579 Explosive Ordnance Disposal Field Squadron at Royal Tunbridge Wells, Reigate, and Rochester
 1st Military Working Dog Regiment
 Regimental Headquarters at Luffenham
 101 Squadron at Aldershot
 102 Squadron
 103 Squadron at North Luffenham
 104 Squadron (V) at North Luffenham
 105 Squadron (V) at North Luffenham

The group is tasked with "[Supporting] both deployed operations and Homeland Defence. The Group locates and disposes of conventional and improvised explosive threats. It provides technical expertise to ensure that the Army’s ammunition is fit for purpose and all forms of Search capability including Military Working Dog support."

Group Commanders 
Group Commanders included:

 1997–1998: Col. Robert J. Griffiths
 1998–2005: Col. John M. Heron
 2005–2007: Col. Nigel H.W. Fenn
 2007–2008: Col. Stephen P. Hodder
 2009–2012: Col. Jonathan A.H. Welch
 2012–2017: Col. A. Gareth Bex 
 2017–2018: Col. Adam D. McRae 
 2018–2021: Col. Daniel A. Reyland
 2021–Present: Col. Brian K. Howard

Notes

References

Sources

Further reading
David C. Isby & Charles Kamps Jr, Armies of NATO's Central Front, Jane's Publishing Company Ltd 1985, .
Peedle, Bob, 'Encyclopedia of the Modern Territorial Army', England : Patrick Stephens, 1990.

External links 
The Royal Engineers Journal, September 1982 - proposed reorganisation of Royal Engineers, including role switch for 29 Engineer Brigade, 1983

Groups of the Royal Engineers
Military units and formations established in the 2000s